Isabelle Gauthier (born 2 April 1980) is a Canadian former competitive ice skater, and as of 2011, one of the Dancing on Ice professional skaters.

Personal life 
She also plays cello and violin, and French was her favourite subject at school. She has a law degree from Université Laval.

Skating career

Competitive 
At the age of six, Gauthier began her skating career in Quebec City. She competed in pair skating. With Danny Provost, she represented Canada at the 1996 World Junior Championships. She later competed with Eric Therrien and Rick Derwantz.

 1995–1996: With Danny Provost; 1996–1998: With Eric Therrien; 1999–2000: With Rick Derwantz

Ice shows 
Since 2002, Gauthier has toured with numerous skating productions, including Disney on Ice and Holiday on Ice. Her skating partners have included Jeff Langdon, Eric Therrien, Danny Provost, Vitali Lysenka, Rick Derwantz and Colin Ratushniak.

In 2011, Gauthier joined Dancing on Ice. Series six was her only series of the show, and she was partnered with television personality and presenter, Jeff Brazier. For the pro routines on the show, she skated with fellow Canadian, Colin Ratushniak.

References 

1980 births
Living people
Canadian female pair skaters